"Lilali" is a song by the Belgian Eurodance singer Kim Kay. It was released in 1998 on EMI as the debut single, lead single and as well as the opening track from her debut studio album, La Vie en lilali (1998). It is a Eurodance song that was written by Guido Veulemans, Wim Claes, and Katrien Gillis and produced by Phil Sterman and Lov Cook.

Upon release in 1998, the "Lilali" became a hit in Europe, especially/particularly in Belgium and France. The song produce over 80,000 copies in Belgium. A year later after its release, a remix of the song were made by the artist and it sold in France over 300,000 copies.

Track listing

Charts

Weekly charts

Year-end charts

Certifications

References

External links
 
 
 
 
 

1998 songs
1998 debut singles
Kim Kay songs
EMI Records singles
French-language songs